Ovulidae, common names the ovulids, cowry allies or false cowries, is a family of small to large predatory or parasitic sea snails, marine gastropod molluscs in the superfamily Cypraeoidea, the cowries and the cowry allies.

Distribution
The ovulids are a widespread family, occurring mostly in tropical and subtropical waters, with most species in the Indo-West Pacific region. But a few species live in temperate waters.

Habitat

Ovulids are carnivorous molluscs that feed on polyps and tissues of Anthozoa (as do the genera Cyphoma and Pseudocyphoma). They live on, and eat, soft corals and sea fans, and they are usually regarded as ectoparasites of these sessile colonial organisms, to which they are anchored by a long and narrow foot. This extreme specialisation in their alimentary regime has caused important morphological modifications to their radula.

Shell description
Ovulids mostly have smooth shiny shells with a very long aperture and a very low or invisible spire. The shell can be pyriform (shaped like a pear), ovate (egg-shaped) to sub-ovate, cylindrical or lanceolate (lance-shaped).

The shell is often monochromatic white, but in some species the shell is pink or reddish.

In a few species of ovulids, the shell quite closely resembles that of cowries. However in many other species, the shells are so elongate that they do not so much resemble the shells of that closely related family.

When these snails are alive, the mantle completely covers the shell almost all of the time. Pictures of living animals usually show the brightly colored and decorated mantle, which looks very different from the often rather plain, shiny surface of the shell.

The color patterns of the mantle closely resemble the color patterns of the host species. This is due to the phenomenon of "alimentary homochromy" (obtaining the same color as the host by feeding on the host). This phenomenon gives them a remarkable camouflage ability.

Taxonomy

2005 taxonomy 
The following five subfamilies have been recognized in the taxonomy of Bouchet & Rocroi (2005):
 Ovulinae Fleming, 1822
 tribe Ovulini Fleming, 1822 – synonyms: Amphiperatidae Gray, 1853; Simniini Schilder, 1927; Volvini Schilder, 1932
 tribe Eocypraeini Schilder, 1924 – synonym: Sulcocypraeini Schilder, 1932
 † Cypraediinae Schilder, 1927
 Jenneriinae Thiele, 1929 – synonym: Cyproglobinini Schilder, 1932
 Pediculariinae Gray, 1853
 Pseudocypraeinae Steadman & Cotton, 1943

See also Schiaparelli et al. (2005).

2007 taxonomy 
Fehse (2007) have elevated subfamily Pediculariinae to family Pediculariidae and tribe Eocypraeini to family Eocypraeidae both to family level based on morphological research of the radulae, shell and animal morphology and the molecular phylogeny research of the 16S ribosomal RNA gene. Subsequently he has established new subfamilies Prionovolvinae and Aclyvolvinae.

family Ovulidae
 subfamily Eocypraeinae F. A. Schilder, 1924
 subfamily Prionovolvinae Fehse, 2007
 subfamily Simniinae Schilder, 1925
 subfamily Ovulinae Fleming, 1828
 subfamily Aclyvolvinae Fehse, 2007

Genera
Genera within the family Ovulidae include:

Subfamily Eocypraeinae F. A. Schilder, 1924 (synonym: Prionovolvinae Fehse, 2007)
 Adamantia Cate, 1973: synonym of Diminovula Iredale, 1930
 † Allmoniella Dolin & Dockery, 2018 
 Amonovula Fehse, 2019
 † Apiocypraea F. A. Schilder, 1927 
 Archivolva F. Lorentz, 2009
Calpurnus Montfort, 1810<
Carpiscula Cate, 1973
Crenavolva Cate, 1973
Cuspivolva Cate, 1973
Dentiovula Hinds, 1844
Diminovula Iredale, 1930
 † Eocypraea Cossmann, 1903 
 † Eotrivia Schilder, 1924 
 † Eschatocypraea Schilder, 1966
Globovula Cate, 1973
 † Grovesia Dolin & Ledon, 2002 
Habuprionovolva Azuma, 1970
Lacrima Cate, 1973
 † Oxycypraea F. A. Schilder, 1927 
Primovula Thiele, 1925
Prionovolva Iredale, 1930
Procalpurnus Thiele, 1939
Prosimnia Schilder, 1925
Pseudosimnia Schilder, 1925
Rotaovula Cate & Azuma in Cate, 1973
Sandalia Cate, 1973
Serratovolva Cate, 1973
 † Taviania Dolin & Pacaud, 2009 
Stohleroma Cate, 1973: synonym of Cuspivolva C. N. Cate, 1973
Testudovolva Cate, 1973

Subfamily Simniinae Schilder, 1925
Cymbovula Cate, 1973
Cyphoma Röding, 1798
Dissona Cate, 1973
Neosimnia Fischer, 1884 – synonym: Spiculata Cate, 1973
Pseudocyphoma Cate, 1973
Simnia Risso, 1826
 Simnialena Cate, 1973

Subfamily Ovulinae Fleming, 1828
Calcarovula Cate, 1973
Kurodavolva Azuma, 1987
Ovula Bruguière, 1789
Pellasimnia Iredale, 1931
Phenacovolva Iredale, 1930
Takasagovolva Azuma, 1974
Volva Röding, 1798
Xandarovula Cate, 1973

Subfamily Aclyvolvinae
Aclyvolva Cate, 1973
Hiatavolva Cate, 1973
Kuroshiovolva Azuma & Cate, 1971

subfamily placement?
 Amonovula (Petuch, 1973)
 Aperiovula Cate, 1973
 Delonovolva Cate, 1973
 Subsimnia

References

Further reading 

 Dolin, L. & Ledon, D. (2002). "Nouveaux taxons et discussion de la systématique des genres correspondants d’Ovulidae (Mollusca, Caenogastropoda) de l’Éocène inférieur de Gan (France)". Geodiversitas 24(2): 329–347. PDF.

External links 

 
 Ovulidae.com
 Gallery of photos
 Ovulidae website (in Japanese but with enough English text)

 
Gastropod families
Taxa named by John Fleming (naturalist)